Aloïs Boudry (12 August 1851, Ypres – 27 November 1938, Antwerp) was a Belgian painter known for his portraits, still lifes and interiors.

Life
He studied at the art schools in Ypres and Roeselare and finished at the Royal Academy of Fine Arts (Antwerp), where his teachers were Nicaise De Keyser and Jozef Van Lerius.

In 1885, he joined "Als ik Kan" (If I Can), an association of visual artists devoted to preserving traditional methods. He participated in the exposition "Brussels International 1910", where he won a silver medal. When the seaside resort of Knokke-Heist began a promotional campaign in 1913, he designed the posters, which became well-known.

At the outbreak of World War I, he fled to England and established himself as a portraitist. In 1917, he moved to Italy to await the end of the war, then returned to Belgium.

Wherever he was, he sought out humble people as the subjects for his paintings. His depictions of the fisherman of Nieuwpoort are especially popular. Many of them can be seen at the National Fishery Museum in Oostduinkerke.

His son, Robert (1872-1961), was also a painter, as was his grandson  (1913-1976). His great-granddaughter, Nele, is currently a painter in Ghent.

References

Further reading
 P. Piron, De Belgische beeldende kunstenaars uit de 19de en 20ste eeuw, Brussel, 1999. 
 Lexicon van West-Vlaamse beeldende kunstenaars, Vol.1, Kortrijk, 1992.
  E. Bénézit, Dictionnaire critique et documentaire des peintres..., Paris, (1976) 
 Catalogue "Als ik kan", Museum van Schone Kunsten, Antwerp, 1976
 Hostyn, Norbert. Liliane Vandenbroucke, François Musin, Armand Delwaide, Aloïs Boudry, August Distave, Ivan Good, Gustaaf Sorel, Eduard Dubar. Het Visserijblad, LV, 1988, 6, pp. 33–34; 9, pp. 34–36; LVI, 1989, 8, p. 43; 9, pp. 46–47; 11, p. 45; 12, pp. 48–49; LVII, 1990, 1, pp. 65–66; 7, pp. 48–49

External links

 Works by Boudry @ Cultured.com Includes a portrait of Boudry by Belgian artist Paul Gosselin (1961- )
 More works by Boudry @ ArtNet

1851 births
1938 deaths
Artists from Ypres
Royal Academy of Fine Arts (Antwerp) alumni
19th-century Belgian painters
19th-century Belgian male artists
20th-century Belgian painters
20th-century Belgian male artists